Sutherland was a constituency that returned shire commissioners to the Parliament of Scotland and to the Convention of the Estates.

Sutherland became a sheriffdom after the resignation of the heritable jurisdiction by the Earl of Sutherland on 28 June 1633.

List of shire commissioners
 1639–40: Robert Murray of Spinningdale
 1641: Robert Murray, now laird of Pulrossie
 1643–44: Robert Gray of Skibo
 1645: Robert Gray of Ballone
 1646–47: Alexander Sutherland of Duffus
 1648: Robert Gray of Ballone
 1649–50: Sir Robert Gordon of Embo
During the Commonwealth of England, Scotland and Ireland, the sheriffdoms of Sutherland, Ross and Cromarty were jointly represented by one Member of Parliament in the Protectorate Parliament at Westminster. After the Restoration, the Parliament of Scotland was again summoned to meet in Edinburgh.
 1661–63: (Sir) Robert Gordon of Langdale, with Sir Robert Gordon of Embo in 1661; Embo's absence was excused in 1663
 1669–74: Sir George Munro of Culrain and Newmore with Robert Gordon of Gordonstoun, yr 1672–74
 1678: Robert Gordon of Gordonstoun, yr with Robert Gordon of Rogart
 1681–82: Robert Gordon of Gordonstoun, yr with John Gordon of Embo, yr
 1685–86: Sir Robert Gordon of Gordonstoun with Sir John Gordon of Doall
 1689 (convention), 1689–90: (Sir) John Gordon of Embo
 1689 (convention), 1689–1700: (Sir) Adam Gordon of Dalfolly (died c.1700)
 1700–02, 1702–05: Alexander Gordon of Garty
 1700–01: John Gordon the younger of Carroll
 1702–04: David Sutherland the younger of Kinnauld

After the Act of Union 1707 Sutherland was represented by one Member of Parliament in the House of Commons at Westminster.

References

Constituencies of the Parliament of Scotland (to 1707)
Constituencies established in 1633
Constituencies disestablished in 1707
1707 disestablishments in Scotland
1633 establishments in Scotland
Politics of the county of Sutherland